Terrence (Terry) Clifford (born 12 November 1938) is a Canadian former educator and politician. Clifford served as a Progressive Conservative party member of the House of Commons of Canada.

Born in Acton, Ontario, Terry was an educator and school principal by career. He was educated at Universities of; Guelph, Toronto and Cornell. Throughout more than 25 years in education, Mr. Clifford taught elementary, secondary and university levels. He innovated several programs, authored a mathematics text series and has accepted Provincial awards for outstanding community leadership both as a teacher and Principal.

Mr. Clifford served almost 10 years in public service. He represented the Ontario riding of London—Middlesex where he was first elected in the 1984 federal election and re-elected in 1988, therefore becoming a member in the 33rd and 34th Canadian Parliaments.  
He served and chaired Caucus and Standing Committees with both national and international responsibilities. Key areas of his work were energy / environment, employment, free trade, transport and European Parliamentary relations.  He has been recognized for his success in forging powerful cross partnerships and for his global initiatives in science, technology, business and education.

Clifford left federal politics in 1993 as he did not campaign for a third term in the House of Commons. While there, he founded  in 1991 a national organization called Global Vision that engages enterprising young Canadians through education and hands on experience to develop as leaders. The mission of Global Vision is to promote Canadian culture and industry to the world. Global Vision sends young Canadians on international trade missions and participates in the Prime Minister's initiatives at APEC, G8 and G20 Summits. Global Vision to date has supported the work of 5 Prime Ministers, trained 30,000 youth and has represented Canada's interests in 30 countries in 6 continents. In 2004, he was made a Member of the Order of Canada for his efforts with Global Vision.

References

External links
 

1938 births
Living people
Members of the House of Commons of Canada from Ontario
Members of the Order of Canada
People from the Regional Municipality of Halton
Progressive Conservative Party of Canada MPs